Eynhallow Sound is a seaway lying between Mainland Orkney and the island of Rousay in the Orkney Islands, Scotland.  The tidal indraught is "scarcely felt beyond a line joining Costa Head and the Reef of Quendale".  An Iron Age broch, Gurness, has a strategic outlook over the Eynhallow Sound.

See also
 Evie, Orkney
 Sands of Evie

References

Landforms of Orkney
Sounds of Scotland